In mathematics, the antilimit is the equivalent of a limit for a divergent series. The concept not necessarily unique or well-defined, but the general idea is to find a formula for a series and then evaluate it outside its radius of convergence.

Common divergent series

See also 
 Abel summation
 Cesàro summation
 Lindelöf summation
 Euler summation
 Borel summation
 Mittag-Leffler summation
 Lambert summation
 Euler–Boole summation and Van Wijngaarden transformation can also be used on divergent series

Reference 

Divergent series
Summability methods
Sequences and series
Mathematical analysis